Love and Marriage is a 1964 Italian anthology comedy film directed by Gianni Puccini and Mino Guerrini.

Plot

The first night
A man "lends" his wife in exchange for a check.

Saturday 18th July
A wife manages to cheat on a very suspicious husband.

Just a moment
A man discovers that his wife is far from faithful as he believed.

The last card
A couple, in order not to give up their comforts, prostitutes themselves.

Cast 
 La prima notte 
Lando Buzzanca
Maria Grazia Buccella
Luciana Angiolillo
Umberto D'Orsi

 Sabato 18 luglio 
Sylva Koscina
Philippe Leroy
 Roberto Fabbri 
 Alrise Estense

 Basta un attimo 
Ingeborg Schöner
 Renato Tagliani 
Marino Masé
 Stephen Forsyth 
 Sandro Moretti

 L'ultima carta 
Eleonora Rossi Drago
Aldo Giuffrè
 Carlo Loffredo 
 April Hennessy 
 Ethel Levin 
 Gioia Durel 
Bruno Scipioni

References

External links

1964 comedy films
1964 films
Italian comedy films
Italian anthology films
Films directed by Gianni Puccini
Films directed by Mino Guerrini
1960s Italian-language films
1960s Italian films